Minister for Housing may refer to:

 Minister for Housing (Australia)
 Minister for Housing (New South Wales)
 Minister for Housing (Victoria)
 Minister for Housing (Western Australia)
 Minister for Housing (Sweden)
 Minister for Housing (United Kingdom)
 Minister for Housing (Wales)